Sart railway station is a railway station in Sart, Turkey. TCDD Taşımacılık operates two daily regional trains from İzmir to Alaşehir and Uşak along with one daily regional train from Manisa to Alaşehir.

The station has a single side platform, serving one track.

References

Railway stations in Manisa Province
Buildings and structures in Manisa Province
Transport in Manisa Province